Deadman's : An Australian Story (1898) is a novel by Australian writer Mary Gaunt.

Story outline

Jocelyn Ruthven is the goldfields commissioner of "Deadman's Creek". Following dubious advice he enters into a disastrous marriage with a young woman but later meets the right one.  The novel details the attempts by all parties to extricate themselves from unwanted relationships and enter into others.

Critical reception

A reviewer in The Evening News found a number of faults with the book: "Mary Gaunt is well known in the literary world as a clever Victorian authoress; but Deadman's does not quite sustain her reputation...The story lacks a certain amount of spirit in it. It deals with rough life in a rough country; with people at their best and at their worst; and, somehow, the style is too smooth for the subject. The situations strike you as forced, and you have an uncomfortable idea of knowing before-hand what is coming. The author has done better work, and can do better work."

See also

 Full text of the novel from Project Gutenberg Australia
 1898 in Australian literature

References

1898 Australian novels